Kache Palacio (born January 30, 1994) is a mixed martial artist and an American football linebacker who is currently a free agent. He played college football at Washington State University and was signed by the Los Angeles Rams as an undrafted free agent in 2016.

Early years
Palacio was born in Gardena, California, grew up in a single family home with his father Emile Palacio in a decently sized suburb south of Los Angeles. He played linebacker for Westchester High School and Junípero Serra High School, where he was a three star recruit and rated 79th at his position nationwide.

College career
In his time at Washington State, Palacio was able to rack up sacks, putting him 10th on the school's all-time list. He played in all 13 games for the Cougars in 2015, tallying 32 tackles, 10 for loss, with 5.0 sacks and two forced fumbles. In his WSU career, he recorded 26 TFLs, 17 sacks, and eight forced fumbles. Despite not being the most noticeable college prospect, he turned some heads at WSU's Pro Day, where he was asked to run drills as a fullback by teams such as the Indianapolis Colts, Seattle Seahawks, and Kansas City Chiefs

Professional career
Palacio was not invited to the NFL Scouting Combine, so his pre-draft measurables were taken from Washington State's Pro Day. NFL Network analyst Gil Brandt reported that Palacio had an "overall good workout" and would be "top priority" undrafted free agent in the NFL.

Los Angeles Rams
Palacio signed with the Los Angeles Rams as an undrafted free agent on May 4, 2016. He was released on May 18, 2016.

Seattle Seahawks
On August 7, 2016, Palacio signed with the Seattle Seahawks. He was waived on September 3, 2016 and was re-signed to the practice squad. He was released on December 27, 2016.

On April 17, 2017, Palacio re-signed with the Seahawks. He was waived on September 2, 2017. He was re-signed to the practice squad on November 22, 2017. He was promoted to the active roster on December 16, 2017. He was waived on December 19, 2017 and re-signed to the practice squad.

GDFL
In 2021 Palacio signed with the minor Gridiron Developmental Football League's Inglewood Blackhawks.

Mixed martial arts career

During his free agency, Palacio has been training mixed martial arts, and made his amateur debut on January 11, 2020. After two straight wins as an amateur, Palacio signed a contract with Lights Out Xtreme Fighting.

Palacio was expected to make his promotional debut at Lights Out Xtreme Fighting 5 on March 13, 2020. However, the event was tentatively rescheduled to be held on April 24, 2020 due to the COVID-19 pandemic.

References

External links
Washington State Cougars bio
Seattle Seahawks bio
 
 

1994 births
Living people
Players of American football from California
People from Gardena, California
Sportspeople from Los Angeles County, California
American football linebackers
Washington State Cougars football players
Los Angeles Rams players
Seattle Seahawks players